Jania Assembly constituency is one of the 126 assembly constituencies of Assam Legislative Assembly in India. Jania forms part of the Barpeta Lok Sabha constituency.

Members of Legislative Assembly 
 1957: Fakhruddin Ali Ahmed, Indian National Congress
 1962: Fakhruddin Ali Ahmed, Indian National Congress
 1972: Ataur Rahman, Indian National Congress
 1978: Abdus Sobhan, Indian National Congress (Indira)
 1983: Abdus Sobhan, Independent
 1985: A. F. Golam Osmani, UMF
 1991: Asahaque Ali, Independent
 1996: Abdur Rouf, UMF
 2001: Asahaque Ali, Indian National Congress
 2006: Abdul Khaleque (Assamese politician), Indian National Congress
 2011: Rafiqul Islam, All India United Democratic Front
 2016: Abdul Khaleque (Assamese politician), Indian National Congress
 2019 bypoll: Rafiqul Islam, All India United Democratic Front
 2021: Rafiqul Islam, All India United Democratic Front

Election results

2016 result

References

External links 
 

Assembly constituencies of Assam